Charles B. Durborow (1882 - 1938) was a record setting distance swimmer from Philadelphia. He was a member of the Philadelphia Athletic Club.

Personal life 
Durborow was born in 1882. He started swimming in 1907. He was a bank clerk in Philadelphia by occupation. He passed away suddenly in 1938, at the age of 56.

References

American male swimmers
Swimmers from Philadelphia
1882 births
1938 deaths